Gerhardsen's Third Cabinet was the cabinet of Norway from 22 January 1955 to 28 August 1963. The government was led by Prime Minister Einar Gerhardsen, marking his third term in said role. The cabinet was defeated in a motion of no-confidence in 1963 following the Kings Bay affair.

Cabinet members

|}

State Secretaries

References
Einar Gerhardsens tredje regjering 1955-1963 - Regjeringen.no

Notes

Gerhardsen 3
Gerhardsen 3
1955 establishments in Norway
1963 disestablishments in Norway
Cabinets established in 1955
Cabinets disestablished in 1963